Golden Rooster Award for Best Writing (中国电影金鸡奖最佳编剧) is the main category of Competition of Golden Rooster Awards, awarding to screenplay writer.

Award Winners & Nominees

1980s

1990s

2000s

2010s

2020s

References

Golden Rooster, Best Writing
Writing Best
Golden Rooster, Best Writing